Arthur Kitching is a given name. Notable people with the name include:

 Arthur Kitching (bishop) (1875–1960), Anglican missionary, bishop and author
 Arthur Kitching (politician) (1840–1919), English stockbroker and Liberal politician